Catharine Harmon Edwards  (born 27 May 1963) is a British ancient historian and academic. She is Professor of Classics and Ancient History at Birkbeck College, University of London. She is a specialist in Roman cultural history and Latin prose literature, particularly Seneca the Younger.

Early life and education
Edwards was born on 27 May 1963 in Redruth, Cornwall, England. She was educated at Clifton High School, a private school in Bristol. She studied classics at Trinity College, Cambridge, graduating with a Bachelor of Arts (BA) degree in 1985 and a Doctor of Philosophy (PhD) degree in 1990. Her doctoral thesis was titled "Transgression and control: studies in ancient Roman immorality".

Academic career
Edwards began her academic career as a junior research fellow at Selwyn College, Cambridge from 1988 to 1989. She then moved to the University of Bristol where she was a lecturer from 1989. She was promoted to senior lecturer in 1997 and to reader in 1999.

Edwards joined Birkbeck College, University of London in 2001 as a lecturer. She has been Professor of Classics and Ancient History since 2006.

Edwards researches Roman cultural history and Latin prose literature, particularly Seneca the Younger. She also researches the reception of Classical antiquity in later periods.

Edwards is the presenter of the three-part BBC series Mothers, Murderers and Mistresses: Empresses of Ancient Rome. She has also contributed to BBC Radio 4's In Our Time series, on Cleopatra, Roman Britain, Virgil's Aeneid, Tacitus and the decadence of Rome, Pliny the Younger, The Augustan Age and Marcus Aurelieus.

She served as president of the Society for the Promotion of Roman Studies from June 2015 to June 2018. In 2021, she was elected a Fellow of the British Academy.

Selected publications
The politics of immorality in ancient Rome. Cambridge University Press, 1993.
Writing Rome: Textual Approaches to the City. Cambridge University Press, 1996.
Rome the Cosmopolis. Cambridge University Press, 2003. (edited with Greg Woolf).
Death in ancient Rome. Yale University Press, 2007.

References

External links 
Catharine Edwards talking on Tiberius and Livia.

1963 births
Living people
British historians
Academics of Birkbeck, University of London
Alumni of Trinity College, Cambridge
British women historians
Fellows of the British Academy
Presidents of The Roman Society
Fellows of Selwyn College, Cambridge
Academics of the University of Bristol
People educated at Clifton High School, Bristol